Mette Klit (born 21 November 1971 in Esbjerg) is a Danish handball coach and former handballer.

Career
In the spring of 2011, she was the only female head coach in the Danish Women's Handball League. She was the head coach for Viborg HK, after replaced Jakob Vestergaard. Before that she was assistant coach in the club. In the summer break 2011 she was replaced by Martin Albertsen. Mette Klit joined then Viborg HK Sportscollege in leadership role.

In the summer of 2012, Klit joined CS Oltchim Râmnicu Vâlcea as assistant to manager Jakob Vestergaard, with whom she had worked before at Viborg HK. She eventually left the club in the summer of 2013. Vestergaard left the Romanian top side on the same occasion

Honours

Player  
 Viborg HK 
Champions League: 
Finalist: 2001 
Champions Trophy: 
Winner: 2001 
EHF Cup: 
Winner: 1999

Coach  
 CSM Bucharest
Liga Naţională:
Winner: 2015
Cupa României: 
Finalist: 2015
Bucharest Trophy:
Winner: 2014

References

External links 
 Profile at eurohandball.com

1971 births
Living people
Danish handball coaches
Danish expatriate sportspeople in Romania
People from Esbjerg
Sportspeople from the Region of Southern Denmark